Molly Morell Macalister (18 May 1920 – 12 October 1979) was a New Zealand artist. Known for painting, woodcarving, and sculpture, her work is held in the collection of the Museum of New Zealand Te Papa Tongarewa.

Early life 
Macalister was born in Invercargill and was the daughter of Catherine Holmes McQueen and Morell Macalister, a partner in the law firm Macalister Brothers.

Education 
Macalister attended the Invercargill South School, Southland Girls’ High School, and the Chilton St James School in Lower Hutt. Her natural ability in drawing was noted as early as 1937.

In 1938 Macalister enrolled at the Canterbury College School of Art (now Ilam School of Fine Arts). Although initially interested in painting and drawing she was drawn to sculpture and the teachings of Francis Shurrock. She assisted Shurrock in his work for the Education Court at the 1939–40 New Zealand Centennial Exhibition, Wellington. In her final year she won the sculpture prize.

Career 

As a teenager Macalister won several awards from the Royal Drawing Society in London.

Between 1942 and 1943 she worked for the Otago University Museum, creating agricultural models and dioramas.

From 1944 until 1949, and 1953, Macalister exhibited with the Auckland Society of Arts. She also exhibited with The Group in 1943 and 1968.

Macalister was a founding member of the New Zealand Society of Sculptors and Associates and was made honorary life member from 1979. She played a key role in the 1971 international sculpture symposium in Auckland.

Commissioned works by Macalister include ‘Maori warrior’ (1964) in Auckland’s Queen Street, ‘Little bull’ (1967) in Hamilton Gardens, stone carvings for the ark in the former Auckland synagogue (1968), and a bust of John A. Lee for the Auckland Public Library (1967).

Personal life 
Macalister moved to Auckland in 1943. She married George Hajdu (later known as Haydn) in Dunedin on 14 August 1945.

References

Further reading 
Artist files for Molly Macalister are held at:
 Angela Morton Collection, Takapuna Library
 E. H. McCormick Research Library, Auckland Art Gallery Toi o Tāmaki
 Robert and Barbara Stewart Library and Archives, Christchurch Art Gallery Te Puna o Waiwhetu
 Fine Arts Library, University of Auckland
 Hocken Collections Uare Taoka o Hākena
 Te Aka Matua Research Library, Museum of New Zealand Te Papa Tongarewa
Also see:
 Concise Dictionary of New Zealand Artists McGahey, Kate (2000) Gilt Edge
 'The Sculpture of Molly Macalister', Robin Woodward, in ''Art New Zealand'

1920 births
1979 deaths
20th-century New Zealand sculptors
People associated with the Museum of New Zealand Te Papa Tongarewa
People educated at Southland Girls' High School
People from Invercargill
Ilam School of Fine Arts alumni
People associated with the Auckland Society of Arts
20th-century New Zealand painters
20th-century New Zealand women artists
People associated with The Group (New Zealand art)